The Atlantic Mine was a copper mine near the Finnish community of Atlantic Mine, Michigan, USA. The mine was operated by Atlantic Mining Company and prospered from 1872-1906.

External links
 History of Finns in Michigan at books.google.com
 Atlantic Mine at www.mindat.com

Copper mines in Michigan
Buildings and structures in Houghton County, Michigan